Showtime at the Apollo (formerly It's Showtime at the Apollo and Apollo Live) is an American variety show that first aired in syndication from September 12, 1987 to May 24, 2008. In 2018, the series returned on Fox with Steve Harvey hosting. Filmed at the legendary Apollo Theater in Harlem, the show features live performances from both professional and up-and-coming artists, and also features the Amateur Night competition. In many cities such as New York (where it aired on WNBC), it often aired after Saturday Night Live during the late Saturday night/early Sunday morning hours, and was often paired with the similarly-syndicated Soul Train.

A live non-televised version of the show takes place every Wednesday (which is the original Apollo Amateur Night competition that has been running for over seventy years), with the taped version of the show for television being recorded in advance on other nights for later airing.

Hosts
Many famous R&B, soul, and hip hop performers have appeared on the show, which has had a number of hosts, including Whoopi Goldberg, Rick Aviles, Martin Lawrence, Sinbad, Donna Summer, Mark Curry, Steve Harvey, Mo'Nique, Christopher "Kid" Reid, and Anthony Anderson. Kiki Shepard served as co-host from 1987 until 2002.

From 1989 to 1991, Sinbad served as the permanent host. After Sinbad left, the show reverted to a series of special guest hosts. In 1993, Steve Harvey began a seven-year stint as the permanent host. At the start of the 1998–99 season, Harvey and Kiki Sheppard hosted a series of "Best of..." episodes until late October because production was delayed due to a labor dispute. After Harvey left in 2000, he was replaced by Rudy Rush. Rush was joined by new comedic dancer C.P. Lacey, who replaced Howard "Sandman" Sims, who had retired. Harvey returned to host the Fox revival of Showtime at the Apollo, beginning on March 1, 2018.

Change of production
The original show was created by veteran television producer Bob Banner in conjunction with Percy Sutton and was produced and directed by BBA senior producer Don Weiner. After a dispute with the Apollo Theater Foundation in 2002, the original producers minus Bob Banner, who was no longer with the show after 1996 left to start a rival show called Showtime in Harlem later known simply as Showtime. Showtime in Harlem was produced at the Brooklyn Academy of Music. The show was later moved to California and renamed Live in Hollywood, lasting one season in 2003 with Shepard as host. It's Showtime at the Apollo was subsequently produced by de Passe Entertainment. It was for a time, hosted once again by Sinbad, who briefly returned to the show in 2006 while Mo'nique was on maternity leave. Whoopi Goldberg became the new host for the 2006–2007 season. At times, comedian and actor Anthony Anderson hosted during the 2006–2007 season.

BET revival
It was announced on September 30, 2011 that the BET cable network would produce a similar show titled Apollo Live starting in 2012 with Tony Rock as the host. The judges are the legendary Gladys Knight; famed beatboxer Doug E Fresh, and Michael Bivins of the 1980s group New Edition and early 1990s group Bell Biv DeVoe.

Fox specials/revival
Showtime at the Apollo was revived by Fox Broadcasting Company in 2016-2017 with a pair of specials hosted by Steve Harvey. The first, a two-hour showcase, aired on December 5, 2016, while the second aired on February 1, 2017. A Christmas special called Showtime at the Apollo: Christmas aired on December 14, 2017 with co-host Adrienne Bailon. It was later announced that Fox would start airing it as a weekly series in the 2017-18 television season, beginning March 1, 2018. Singer Cam Anthony won the 2018 season with his performance of the Bill Withers song, "Ain't No Sunshine".

Awards and nominations
Showtime at the Apollo has won a NAACP Image Award for "Outstanding Variety Series/Special" in 1991. The show was nominated in 1996, 1998, and 1999 for the same category. In 2000, the show was nominated by the NAACP Image Awards for "Outstanding Youth or Children's Series/Special" for the "Apollo Kids Finals" special episode. However, that same year, former host Steve Harvey has won an Image Award for "Outstanding Performance in a Variety Series/Special".

References

External links

FOX site
Official Apollo Theater website

1987 American television series debuts
2008 American television series endings
2018 American television series debuts
2018 American television series endings
1980s American music television series
1990s American music television series
2000s American music television series
2010s American music television series
1980s American variety television series
1990s American variety television series
2000s American variety television series
2010s American variety television series
African-American television
American television series revived after cancellation
English-language television shows
First-run syndicated television programs in the United States
Fox Broadcasting Company original programming
Singing talent shows